Conglutinin is a collectin protein.

External links
 

Collectins